Seeing Stars was the only album by the band Seeing Stars. It was essentially intended to be the fifth studio album by UK band All About Eve. In the aftermath of the Ultraviolet album's release – its bad reception and lost recording contract – whilst this album was being recorded in early 1993, lead singer Julianne Regan left the writing and recording session.

The remaining members of the group, Andy Cousin (bass), Mark Price (drums), and Marty Willson-Piper (guitars and, on this record, lead vocals), continued their work on the album. It was released four years later on the Swedish Border Music label, as a limited pressing.

In 1999, following the reformation of All About Eve, renewed interest in the band saw a re-release of the album in a limited pressing of 500 copies. Nearly all of them were sold at All About Eve gigs during their Fairy Light Nights period.

Track listing
All tracks composed by Andy Cousin and Marty Willson-Piper, with Mark Price on tracks 1-5, 7-10
  "Salome"
  "I Can't Hate You"
  "Where the Rainstorm Ends"
  "Staring at the Sun"
  "A Drink to Drift Away"
  "Ugly and Cruel"
  "Venus of Prose"
  "Come"
  "Mesmerized"
  "Pendulum"

Personnel
Seeing Stars
Marty Willson-Piper - vocals, guitar
Andy Cousin - bass, string arrangements
Mark Price - drums
with:
Anna Nyström - piano on "A Drink to Drift Away" and flute on "Ugly and Cruel"

Notes
In addition to the Cousin/Price/Willson-Piper line-up, "A Drink to Drift Away" and "Ugly and Cruel" also featured Anna Nyström of The Lucy Nation on piano.

An earlier provisional title of the album was Never Swallow Stars.

Not quite an official fifth All About Eve studio album (but more an EP), was recorded and released in 2002, by Cousin and Regan and is titled Iceland. It consists mostly of covers, re-recordings and remixes, plus a couple of new tracks.

References

External links
Seeing Stars on fan site for Marty Willson-Piper's band The Church.
Another fan page on Seeing Stars.
Julianne Regan official site
Translated interview with Marty Willson-Piper from Swedish 'Magazine Groove' magazine
Copy of Marty Willson-Piper interview from German 'Zillo' magazine, mentioning Seeing Stars

1997 debut albums